Menegazzia minuta is a rare species of foliose lichen that is endemic to Tasmania, Australia. It was scientifically described as a new species in 1987 by lichenologists Peter James and Gintaras Kantvilas. The type specimen was collected by the second author south of Arthur River, where the lichen was found in a rainforest growing on twigs of leatherwood (Eucryphia lucida). The species epithet minuta refers to the small size of its thallus. Menegazzia minuta contains protolichesterinic acid, a lichen product that helps to distinguish it from the similar species Menegazzia eperforata, which instead contains stictic acid and related compounds. In a 2012 publication, Kantvilas called M. minuta "one of Tasmania's rarest lichens", characterised by a "glossy olive-brown thallus of minute, spidery lobes, densely beset with lobule-like isidia".

See also
List of Menegazzia species

References

minuta
Lichen species
Lichens described in 1987
Lichens of Australia
Taxa named by Peter Wilfred James
Taxa named by Gintaras Kantvilas